, often shortened to DRRR!!, is a Japanese light novel series written by Ryohgo Narita, with illustrations by Suzuhito Yasuda. Durarara!! tells the story of a dullahan working as an underworld courier in Ikebukuro, an internet-based anonymous gang called the Dollars, and the chaos that unfolds around the most dangerous people in Ikebukuro. The series ran for thirteen volumes, published by ASCII Media Works under their Dengeki Bunko imprint. A sequel series, titled Durarara!! SH and set two years after the events of the original series, started in 2014.

A manga adaptation of the same name, first illustrated by Akiyo Satorigi and later by Aogiri, has been serialized in Square Enix's shōnen manga magazine Monthly GFantasy since July 2009. A 24-episode anime television series adaptation was broadcast from January to June 2010. It was followed by a 36-episode second season, titled Durarara!!×2, broadcast from January 2015 to March 2016.

Plot

Mikado Ryūgamine, a young boy who longs for the exciting life of the big city, moves to Ikebukuro to attend Raira Academy with his childhood friend Masaomi Kida, whom he has not seen since he was young. After the two meet at the train station, they set out to explore the streets of Ikebukuro. Masaomi warns Mikado about people he does not want to cross in the city such as the violent and superhumanly strong man Shizuo Heiwajima, the information broker Izaya Orihara, and the mysterious gang known as "The Dollars." After running into some of the side characters, Mikado sees a local legend called the "Black Rider" who rides around Ikebukuro on a black motorcycle that occasionally neighs like a horse and who is rumored to have no head under her helmet. The "Black Rider's" real name is Celty Sturluson; she is an Irish dullahan who is in Ikebukuro looking for her stolen head while working as an underworld courier. The narrative follows all of the characters equally, showing how their lives intersect and create a greater plot line from each character's knowledge about a common incident.

The story is told from the perspective of approximately eleven of the main characters and changes every episode in the anime, sometimes even more often. One of the few constants given in every episode is that the narrator gives his own opinion on the current situation that he is in as well as what things that make him tick and keep him going in Ikebukuro: a city with a large underbelly that is the medium for the majority of both the plot's development and random violence throughout the series.

Production
Although it has commonly been claimed that the title "Durarara" is an onomatopoeia for the "revving of an engine," Narita states specifically in the first light novel volume that the name means absolutely nothing. He had been editing the finished draft of his book, when his editor called. When prompted for a title, Narita "...just randomly gave a name, 'Du...Durarara?'" Upon hearing this, his editor responded with a positive remark as he liked ambiguous titles."

Media

Light novel
The Durarara!! light novels are written by Ryohgo Narita and illustrated by Suzuhito Yasuda. The first novel was released in April 2004 under ASCII Media Works under their Dengeki Bunko imprint and the thirteenth and final novel was released in January 2014. A sequel series, titled , started in 2014.

A Chinese-language release in Taiwan and Hong Kong is published by the Taiwan branch of Kadokawa Media under their Fantastic Novels imprint. Daewon C.I. licensed the Korean-language release of the series in South Korea and releases the novels under their Newtype Novels imprint. As of January 2015, it was announced that Yen Press would be releasing the Durarara!! novels in English under their Yen On Imprint. In October 2020, Yen Press announced it had licensed the Durarara!! SH novels for release.

Durarara!! SH

Orihara Izaya to, Yūyake wo

Durarara!! × Hakata Tonkotsu Ramens

Manga

A manga adaptation of the first arc, written by Narita and illustrated by Akiyo Satorigi first appeared in the May issue of Square Enix's Monthly GFantasy in April 2009 and became a regular series starting with the magazine's July issue released June 2009. Four tankōbon have been released. The sequels, starting with Durarara!! Saika Arc followed. The manga is licensed in North America by Yen Press who released the first volume in January 2012.

A manga adaptation of the Durarara!! 3way standoff -alley- video game was serialized from the September issue of ASCII Media Works' monthly Sylph magazine released on July 22, 2013 to the October issue released on August 22, 2014 and was collected in two volumes. Another two-volume adaptation of Durarara!! Relay video game was serialized in the same magazine from October 22, 2014 to November 21, 2015.

A crossover manga with Yozakura Quartet, titled YZQ ✕ DRRR!!, was released with the limited edition Blu-Ray of Yozakura Quartet ~Hana no Uta~.

Anime

An anime adaption of the light novels was announced in the wraparound sleeve of the sixth volume of the light novel. The anime is produced by Brain's Base and started airing on January 8, 2010, on MBS, TBS, and CBC. The anime was simulcasted for English-speaking audiences within 24 hours of its Japanese premiere. The anime adapted the first three novels, and it was licensed by Beez Entertainment for European release; while at Anime Expo 2010, Aniplex of America confirmed that they have the license to Durarara!!, later producing an English dub for a January 2011 release. The English dub was produced at Bang Zoom! Entertainment. The music for the first season was composed by Makoto Yoshimori, who also wrote the music for Baccano!.

Aniplex of America released Durarara!! in three digipak, two-disc sets. Part one was released on January 25, 2011, part two was released on March 29, 2011, and part three was released on May 31, 2011. They were exclusively sold at RightStuf.com and at Bandai Entertainment's The Store. As of March 29, 2011, Durarara!! (Eps. 1–9, dubbed) have been added to the U.S. PlayStation Network Video Store. The anime began its U.S. broadcast on Cartoon Network's Adult Swim programming block on June 26, 2011, and aired its last episode on December 18, 2011.

On March 15, 2014, a new TV anime series was announced, titled . The main staff from the first series returned, though it was produced at studio Shuka instead of Brain's Base. It aired in three different cours, or quarters of a year. The first cour began in January 2015, the second cour began in July 2015, and the third cour began in January 2016. Crunchyroll simulcasts the series in North America, Central America, South America, Ireland, and the United Kingdom. Aniplex of America licensed the series and is streaming an English dub via Crunchyroll, Funimation and Hulu.

Radio
An internet radio show called  was aired on February 26, 2010, and ended as of March 25, 2011. The hosts were Toshiyuki Toyonaga and Kana Hanazawa, the voices for Mikado Ryūgamine and Anri Sonohara respectively.

Video games
Two games based on the series were released only in Japan, both visual novels.  The first one titled  was released for PlayStation Portable on September 22, 2010. An updated version with new routes, also for the PSP, titled  was released on August 25, 2011. It was also ported to Android under the title  on November 22, 2011. As part of the Durarara 10th anniversary project, a port with new minigames titled  was announced; and was released on June 19, 2014, for PlayStation Vita. Another PlayStation Vita game titled Durarara!! Relay was released in January 2015.

Reception
According to Oricon, the ninth volume of Durarara!! was the first to sell the most over a week in its bunkobon for February 7–13; previously, the highest-ranked DRRR!! volume had been the eighth, which ranked second.

In a 2019 Forbes' article about the best anime of the 2010s decade, Lauren Orsini considered it to be one of the five best anime of 2010; she wrote, "With one is the largest casts I've ever seen in a show, all introduced at once, it's a wild ride with something for everyone". Crunchyroll staff also included it in such a list; writer Sergio Vaca said, "Despite including numerous elements, the anime manages to have multiple characters show us different perspectives of these events, making us feel really involved with the story and always keeping us on the edge of our seats with unexpected twists".

References

External links

 
 Durarara!! web radio show 
 

2004 Japanese novels
2009 manga
2010 anime television series debuts
2010 video games
2015 anime television series debuts
2015 video games
2016 anime television series debuts
ASCII Media Works games
ASCII Media Works manga
Action anime and manga
Anime and manga based on light novels
Aniplex franchises
Brain's Base
Dengeki Bunko
Fiction about urban legends
Gangs in fiction
Japan-exclusive video games
Kadokawa Dwango franchises
Kadokawa Shoten games
Light novels
Mythology in anime and manga
Novels set in Tokyo
Organized crime in anime and manga
PlayStation Portable games
PlayStation Vita games
Suspense anime and manga
Television shows based on light novels
Television shows set in Tokyo
Tokyo in fiction
Urban fantasy anime and manga
Video games developed in Japan
Works about the Russian Mafia
Yakuza in anime and manga
Yen Press titles